Joshua J. Moore (born August 20, 1988) is a former American football cornerback. He was drafted by the Chicago Bears in the fifth round of the 2010 NFL Draft. He played college football for Kansas State University.

References

External links
Chicago Bears bio
Kansas State Wildcats biography

1988 births
Living people
Players of American football from Fort Lauderdale, Florida
American football cornerbacks
Kansas State Wildcats football players
Chicago Bears players
Denver Broncos players
Blanche Ely High School alumni